The Immediate Geographic Region of São Sebastião do Paraíso is one of the 10 immediate geographic regions in the Intermediate Geographic Region of Varginha, one of the 70 immediate geographic regions in the Brazilian state of Minas Gerais and one of the 509 of Brazil, created by the National Institute of Geography and Statistics (IBGE) in 2017.

Municipalities 
It comprises 5 municipalities.

 Jacuí      
 Itamogi    
 Monte Santo de Minas    
 São Tomás de Aquino    
 São Sebastião do Paraíso

References 

Geography of Minas Gerais